Thomas Rosenlöcher (29 July 1947 – 13 April 2022) was a German writer and poet.

References 

1947 births
2022 deaths
German male writers
German male poets
Members of the Academy of Arts, Berlin
Writers from Dresden